Professor Kefah Mokbel FRCS is the lead consultant breast surgeon at the London Breast Institute of the Princess Grace Hospital, Professor (Honorary) of Breast Cancer Surgery at Brunel University London, an honorary consultant breast surgeon at St George's Hospital. Kefah Mokbel is the founder and current president of Breast Cancer Hope; a UK-based charity "dedicated to improving the quantity and quality of life in women diagnosed with breast cancer".
He was appointed as a substantive consultant breast surgeon at St George's Hospital NHS trust in February 2001.
He was named in Tatler magazine's Best Doctors Guide as one of the featured "Top Breast Surgeons" in 2006, 2007 and 2013. In November 2010 he was named in the Times magazine's list of Britain's Top Doctors.

Personal details and education 
Kefah Mokbel was born in 1965 in the currently occupied Golan Heights in Syria. At the end of junior high school, he was awarded a national scholarship after he passed the Brevet des collèges in Syria (1980). In 1983 he was awarded a scholarship to study medicine in the United Kingdom after completing the Syrian Baccalaureate national examination with full marks. Kefah Mokbel learned English in Eastbourne and then studied A levels in a boarding school (Concord College) in Shrewsbury. He graduated (MB, BS) from the University of London in 1990. He qualified as a Fellow of the Royal College of Surgeons (FRCS, England) in 1994. He was granted the Master of Surgery degree in 2000 by The Imperial College of Science, Technology and Medicine for his research in the field of molecular biology of breast cancer.

In 2002, Mokbel was appointed an Honorary Professor at The Brunel Institute of Cancer Genetics and Pharmacogenomics at Brunel University in recognition of his contribution to breast cancer research. In 2005, he was appointed as a Reader in Breast Surgery at St George's University of London in recognition of his outstanding research contribution in the field of breast cancer.

Clinical interests 
Mokbel's clinical interests in the field of breast surgery include the early detection of breast cancer, breast ductoscopy, minimally-invasive breast surgery, sentinel node biopsy, skin-sparing mastectomy, breast reconstruction, cosmetic breast surgery, prevention of breast cancer, genetic predisposition, integrative oncology and the management of benign conditions including breast cysts, mastalgia and fibroadenomas. Mokbel has extensive experience in the field of reconstructive and aesthetic breast surgery including augmentation mammoplasty (replacement of implants and correction of contracture), reduction mammoplasty and mastopexy.

Research interests
Mokbel's main research interest lies in the field of molecular biology and the clinical management of breast cancer. Furthermore, he has published several papers in the field of aesthetic breast surgery including breast reconstruction following mastectomy and augmentation mammoplasty using implants and fat transfer. His prolific research output includes over 300 published papers in medical literature. According to Google Scholar Kefah Mokbel has 400 publications which have been cited more than 8000 times with a H-index of 53 and an i10-index of 180. Furthermore, his research linked the SET domain containing protein 2 (SETD2) gene to human breast cancer. He has also written 14 books in various disciplines including surgery, oncology, breast cancer, and postgraduate medical education. Mokbel is a member of the editorial board of several international medical journals and a peer reviewer for medical journals including The Lancet.

In October 2017 Mokbel and his team reported through a metaanalysis that the use of hair dyes could be associated with a 20% increase in breast cancer risk.

 
In October 2018, Mokbel and his team reported that the use of testosterone gel for hyposexual desire might not increase breast cancer risk among women using it.

Press and media coverage 
Kefah Mokbel has been also featured in many publications and interviews regarding breast cancer and surgery in the national and international media including: The Times, The Daily Telegraph, The Guardian, New York Post, The BBC, ITV, NBC Washington, Hello Magazine, ABC News, MSN, Yahoo, The Daily Express, The Independent, The Medical Daily, The Evening Standard., The Mirror., Marie Claire and British Sky Broadcasting. 
He also writes medical articles for totalhealth and is one of totalhealth's specialist consultants.
In 2013, Kefah Mokbel featured on BBC world news regarding the news that actress Angelina Jolie had preventative double mastectomy after finding that she is a BRCA1 gene carrier He was depicted by Silas Carson in the BBC drama The C Word, about his real-life patient Lisa Lynch.

Current appointments 

Mokbel is currently the Director of Breast Surgery at The London Breast Institute of The Princess Grace Hospital, chair of the multidisciplinary breast cancer program of the London Breast Institute, Professor (Honorary) of Breast Cancer Surgery (Brunel University, London), Honorary Consultant Breast Surgeon at St George's Hospital (London, UK) and President of Breast Cancer Hope Foundation.

References

External links 
 Princess Grace Hospital, London 
 Breast Cancer Hope 
 Breastspecialist.co.uk 
 The London Breast Institute 

British surgeons
Syrian surgeons
21st-century British medical doctors
Academics of Brunel University London
1965 births
Living people
Alumni of the University of London
Fellows of the Royal College of Surgeons
English people of Syrian descent
Academics of the University of London
Syrian emigrants to the United Kingdom
Alumni of Imperial College London